Francisco Hernandez Villaruz Jr. (born June 8, 1943) is a Filipino justice. He was appointed on October 5, 2011, by President Benigno Aquino III as Presiding Justice of the Sandiganbayan replacing Justice Edilberto Sandoval who retired last June 20, 2011. Justice Villaruz has been an Associate Justice of the Sandiganbayan since 2001. He took his oath before Supreme Court Chief Justice Renato C. Corona last October 12, 2011.

His most notable case was the Plunder trial of former President Joseph Estrada, being a member of the Sandiganbayan Special Division that convicted the former President of plunder.

Profile
Villaruz's parents are Francisco Villaruz of Nueva Ecija and Consuelo Hernandez-Villaruz of Malabon. He is married to lawyer Teresita M. Villaruz. They have one child:  Lawyer Carlos M. Villaruz.

Villaruz finished his elementary (1955) and high school education (1959) at the Ateneo de Manila University. He obtained his B.S. in Political Science degree from the Ateneo de Manila University in 1963 and his Bachelor of Laws degree from the University of the Philippines, where he graduated third in his class in 1967. He passed the Philippine Bar Examination of August 1967 with bar rating of 84.6%.

Villaruz worked in the private sector for almost four decades before being appointed Associate Justice of the Sandiganbayan in 2001. He is known for his professionalism and diligence, proof of which are the six decisions and 100 resolutions that he renders every month, and his 99 percent affirmance rating. A respected expert in his field, Villaruz was also Bar Examiner in Criminal Law in 2004 and an MCLE Lecturer.

Erap Plunder Trial
Villaruz is included in the 3-justices panel who tried the anti-graft court's special division on the Erap plunder case. The Sandiganbayan, has 90 days or until mid-September 2007 to decide the case of former President Joseph Ejercito Estrada, but the decision could be issued much sooner than that. Villaruz was candidate for the vacant post of Supreme Court Associate Justice, duly nominated by the JBC for the vacancy due to retirement of Angelina Sandoval-Gutierrez.

On September 5, 2007,  Leonardo-de Castro, and Sandiganbayan Associate Justices Diosdado Peralta and Francisco Villaruz Jr. were assigned 2 extra bodyguards 3 weeks ago per initiative of the Sheriff (after getting threatening messages from an anonymous person). Renato Bocar, executive clerk of court confirmed the “new face" in De Castro's office who has been “acting like a bodyguard."

On September 7, 2007, the Sandiganbayan's Teresita De Castro announced that the graft court will promulgate the judgment on September 12, 2007, in the 6-year-old plunder trial (October 2001 to June 15, 2007) of ousted President Joseph Ejercito Estrada. The verdict will also include his son, Sen. Jinggoy Estrada; and lawyer Eduardo Serapio. Court Sheriff Ed Urieta said tight security will include 4,000 police and 2,000 soldiers, and military. Estrada is accused of stealing 4 billion pesos (US$81 million; €62 million) in illegal funds and falsely declaring his assets. On September 11, 2007, the Supreme Court of the Philippines allowed live television (broadcast media) coverage of the Sandiganbayan's Joseph Estrada's promulgation of judgment on September 12, 2007 (granting the petition of the Kapisanan ng Brodkaster ng Pilipinas). The court, however, directed media to hook up with a video camera of the personnel of the Supreme Court public information office.

On September 11, 2007, as controversial political figure, Estrada released a statement to the poor Filipinos: "I have been imprisoned for 6 years, 4 months and 17 days but because of your prayers, help and love, I have endured all these ... Whatever the Sandiganbayan (corruption court) will decide, I am ready because I know my countrymen have acquitted me.

The decision
On September 12, 2007, Joseph Estrada was acquitted of perjury but found guilty of plunder and sentenced to reclusion perpetua with the accessory penalties of perpetual disqualification from public office and forfeiture of ill-gotten wealth.

On September 12, 2007, Sandiganbayan's Presiding Justice Teresita De Castro and 2 other magistrates Diosdado M. Peralta and Francisco H. Villaruz Jr. unanimously acquitted his son, Senator Jinggoy Estrada, and a lawyer Edward Serapio of plunder charges. The Fallo of the 262-page Decision declared the forfeiture in favor of the government: P542.701 million (bank accounts including interest), P189 million (Jose Velarde accounts including interest) and the Boracay mansion in New Manila, Quezon City.

Only the fallo or dispositive part of 2 judgments were read (resulting to only 15 minutes judicial proceedings). During the reading of the judgment, witnesses said Joseph Estrada cried; his wife, Luisa Ejercito Estrada, Jackie Ejercito Lopez, San Juan Mayor Joseph Victor "JV" Ejercito, (Estrada's son with Guia Gomez), other family members and mistresses (including, Laarni Enriquez) all wept during the promulgation by the clerk.

Estrada's lawyer Estelito Mendoza stated that Estrada will file a motion for reconsideration (before September 27) of the 262-page Judgment and then appeal the verdict to the High Tribunal. The Philippine Chamber of Commerce and Industry said it will support a presidential pardon for Estrada. Jinggoy Estrada said The people will receive this with moral outrage and disgust. The time of reckoning will come. That time may not be too far now. ``This verdict is intended to legitimize the occupancy of an illegal tenant in MalacanangEstrada, in Filipino Barong Tagalog (pineapple fibre dress shirt and cream trousers) with his trademark wristband stated that "I thought the role of justice would prevail here but really it's a kangaroo court." President Gloria Macapagal Arroyo stated that the court's decision must be accepted: "We hope and pray that the rule of law will prevail." Estrada's counsel Rene A.V. Saguisag issued the statement:"VICTORS' JUSTICE" - "It's victors' justice. It's ruling class justice. The special division (of the court) was programmed to convict. We never had a chance." Estrada will appeal the verdict and would be under automatic review at the Supreme Court of the Philippines.

Estrada told AFP that he was resigned for the latest drama in his presidency: "last and best performance of my life." The prosecution's lead counsel Dennis Villa-Ignacio proudly asserted: "It shows that our judicial system really works.This is the last chance for the state to show that we can do it, that we can charge, prosecute and convict a public official regardless of his stature."

Joseph Estrada rose from obscurirty to having been top Filipino film star, then hit the mark, by claiming the Presidency until destiny sent him to jail. He stated to AFP "I feel depressed, but it's my style not to show it." Before the release of the fatalistic judgment, he warned that he prevent his fans from making street protests.

Estrada returned to his villa in Tanay, Rizal (driven on from a golf cart), to the helicopter) The court permitted him to return to his villa, "until further orders".

Meanwhile, the U.S. embassy stated that the arrival of the USS Chung-Hoon and USS Milius, Missile destroyers was a goodwill visit to strengthen the ties between the United States and the Philippines.

 Appeal 
On September 26, 2007, Joseph Estrada appealed by filing a 63-page motion for reconsideration of the Sandiganbayan judgment penned by Teresita de Castro (submitting 5 legal grounds). Estrada alleged that the court erred "when it convicted him by acquitting his alleged co-conspirators."

On October 5, 2007, the Sandiganbayan's Special Division ruled to have set for October 19, oral argument (instead of a defense reply) on Joseph Estrada's motion for reconsideration. Estrada asked court permission to attend the hearing, since it ordered the prosecution to file comment before October 11.

 Aftermath 
On September 14, 2007, Chief presidential legal counsel Sergio Antonio Apostol officially stated that Sandiganbayan Justices Teresita Leonardo de Castro, Diosdado Peralta and Francisco Villaruz Jr. should decline Judicial and Bar Council nomination and await other vacancies to ease pressure on President Gloria Macapagal Arroyo: “Para Hindi na maipit ang Presidente (In order to spare the President from pressure), they should withdraw their nomination. Parang iyong nangyari kay Justice (Gregory) Ong (Remember what happened in Justice Gregory S. Ong’s case) ...It’s a sacrifice on her part..Hindi niya maiwanan (ang posisyon) (She cannot leave the Sandiganbayan) because of the case of Joseph Estrada - Erap (Estrada’s nickname)." In the aftermath of the verdict, De Castro, Villaruz and Peralta are now at the receiving end of  2 unsolicited advices from key officials. Senate of the Philippines Majority Leader Francis Pangilinan, ex-officio member, Judicial and Bar Council stated that the 3 Sandiganbayan justices "should have the delicadeza not to accept a promotion to the highest tribunal to dispel any suspicion that they pronounced Mr. Estrada guilty expecting a reward from Palace ... We do not want to see a cloud of suspicion over the appointees to the Supreme Court. They should always be above suspicion.”

On October 16, 2007, the Judicial and Bar Council (JBC) announced the final nominees to the October 20 Associate Justice Cancio Garcia vacant Supreme Court of the Philippines Associate Justice post. Teresita De Castro, Justices Edgardo Cruz and Martin Villarama, got 7 out of 8 votes, while Associate Justices Francisco Villaruz and Edilberto G. Sandoval and Labor Secretary Arturo D. Brion got 5 votes each (from the JBC). The President has 90 days to choose from the above final list.

On November 5, 2007, Senator Jinggoy Estrada, in a privileged speech vowed to block the appointment to the Supreme Court of Sandiganbayan Justices Teresita De Castro and Francisco Villaruz Jr. (who convicted his father - President Joseph Estrada). Jinggoy said that: "Such a promotion would seem like a reward in exchange for the guilty verdict against the deposed President. We are convinced, then and now, that the special court created to exclusively try the case of President Estrada was established precisely to convict him, which is what exactly happened''."

Reactions
Joseph Estrada branded as a “reward for an unjust conviction” the appointment of Teresita de Castro: “I knew even then that the special court created by the Supreme Court would convict me of plunder. But I had hoped even then that it will be the law that de Castro and the other justices would uphold, not the expectation of a seat in the Supreme Court. Justice de Castro turned her back on the law, turned a blind eye on the sacrosanct obligation of a judge to rule on the merits of the case as presented by my lawyers and turned her court into a kangaroo court to convict me. Even lawyers who read the ruling made by the Sandiganbayan justices on the plunder case would see just how the law on plunder was prostituted with the intention to convict me. The justices convicted me, but the people who know better that I am innocent of the charges of plunder, have acquitted me. If I were guilty, they know I would not have the strength to face them. Neither will they welcome me with open arms whenever I visit them."

TRAINING COURSES
Program of Instruction for Lawyers (June 2005 : Harvard Law School)
First PHILJA Pre Judicature Program (July 2000:PHILJA)
World Intellectual Property Conference (1994 : WIPO (World Intellectual Property Organization))
Management Development Program (1984 : AIM (Asian Institute of Management) )

See also
Supreme Court of the Philippines
Philippine Court of Appeals
Philippine Court of Tax Appeals
Sandiganbayan
Philippines
Political History of the Philippines
Constitution of the Philippines

References

External links
Sandiganbayan – Official Website
Sandiganbayan – Chan Robles Virtual Law Library – Information on the Sandiganbayan

1943 births
Living people
20th-century Filipino lawyers
21st-century Filipino lawyers
University of the Philippines alumni
Ateneo de Manila University alumni
Justices of the Sandiganbayan